There are numerous Motorsports Hall of Fames:

Auto Racing Hall of Fame - United States
Canadian Motorsport Hall of Fame - Canada
International Motorsports Hall of Fame - autoracers from around the world
Motorcycle Hall of Fame - United States
Motorsports Hall of Fame of America - United States
NASCAR Hall of Fame - United States
National Dirt Late Model Hall of Fame - United States
National Midget Auto Racing Hall of Fame - United States
National Sprint Car Hall of Fame & Museum - United States
Off-road Motorsports Hall of Fame - off-road racers from around the world
SCCA Hall of Fame - Sports Car Club of America, United States

See also
List of halls and walks of fame